The Communion of Reformed Evangelical Churches (CREC), formerly the Confederation of Reformed Evangelical Churches, was founded in 1998 as a body of churches that hold to Reformed (Calvinistic) theology. Member churches include those from Presbyterian, Reformed, and Reformed Baptist backgrounds. The CREC has over a hundred member churches in the United States, Canada, Japan, Russia, Hungary, Ukraine, Bulgaria, Belarus, Poland, Brazil, and the Czech Republic. These are organised into seven presbyteries, named after figures in church history: Anselm, Athanasius, Augustine, Hus, Knox, Tyndale, and Wycliffe.

Doctrine
The Communion of Reformed Evangelical Churches holds to classic Calvinism (as promulgated in the Westminster Standards, Three Forms of Unity, and 1689 Baptist Confession of Faith), but on some doctrines in which Calvinists differ, (e.g., the Federal Vision, paedocommunion, and paedobaptism) the CREC allows each church to decide its own stance.
The Communion of Reformed Evangelical Churches allows member churches to hold to any of the following historic confessions:
 Westminster Confession of Faith (1647)
 American Westminster Confession of Faith (1789)
 The Three Forms of Unity:
 Belgic Confession (1561)
 Heidelberg Catechism (1563)
 Canons of Dort (1619)
 The London Baptist Confession (1689)
 The Savoy Declaration (1658)
 Second Helvetic Confession
 39 Articles
 The Reformed Evangelical Confession

The CREC rejects both modernism and fundamentalism.

Worship
Churches in CREC generally practise covenant renewal worship.

Notable members
 Peter Leithart 
 Steve Wilkins
 Douglas Wilson
 N. D. Wilson
 Rich Lusk

References

External links
 

Christian organizations established in 1998
Calvinist denominations established in the 20th century
Evangelical denominations established in the 20th century
Reformed denominations in Canada
Reformed denominations in the United States
Evangelical denominations in North America